Sandy Creek Historic District is a national historic district located in the village of Sandy Creek in Oswego County, New York.  The district includes 14 contributing buildings on 11 properties.  It includes the cohesive intact collection of late 19th century and early 20th century buildings on Main Street and Harwood Drive.

It was listed on the National Register of Historic Places in 1988.

References

Historic districts on the National Register of Historic Places in New York (state)
Historic districts in Oswego County, New York
National Register of Historic Places in Oswego County, New York